Conger philippinus is an eel in the family Congridae (conger/garden eels). It was described by Robert H. Kanazawa in 1958. It is a tropical, marine eel which is known from the western central Pacific Ocean.

References

Conger
Endemic fauna of the Philippines
Fish of the Philippines
Taxa named by Robert H. Kanazawa
Fish described in 1958